Charles Seaver (17 October 1820 – 29 January 1907) was an Irish Anglican priest  in the second half of the 19th century and the first decade of the 20th.

Seaver was born in Armagh and educated at Trinity College, Dublin. Murray began his ecclesiastical career with curacies in Newry, Mullaghbrack and Sandyford. He was the  incumbent at St John, Belfast from 1853 to 1886. He was Archdeacon of Connor from 1886 to 1893; and Dean of Connor from 1893 until his death.

References

19th-century Irish Anglican priests
20th-century Irish Anglican priests
Archdeacons of Connor
Alumni of Trinity College Dublin
1907 deaths
1820 births
People from Armagh (city)